Curio Collection by Hilton is an upscale hotel brand within the Hilton Worldwide portfolio. Curio Collection is a soft brand, meaning its hotels are supported by Hilton, but retain their own individual branding. Hilton selects independent hotels and resorts to be part of the Curio Collection.

The brand was launched in June 2014, and was Hilton's first "collection" brand. By January 2017, Curio Collection comprised more than 30 hotels and resorts in seven countries. As of December 31, 2019, it has 91 properties with 16,638 rooms in 27 countries and territories, including 20 that are managed with 4,322 rooms and 71 that are franchised with 12,316 rooms.

Curio Collection properties use Hilton's reservation system and are part of Hilton Honors, Hilton's guest-loyalty program.

Collection
Properties under the Curio Collection (as of January 2023):

Former properties

Gallery

Competition
Curio Collection by Hilton is likened to Marriott International's Autograph Collection and Tribute Collection.

References

Hilton Worldwide
Hotels established in 2014